J. Kevin Pike (born 9 May 1951) is an American film special effects supervisor, former below-the-line talent agent, and screenwriting consultant. Pike is best known for supervising the Special Effects of the 1985 film Back to the Future. He and his company Filmtrix, Inc. were responsible for the construction of the film's iconic DeLorean Time Machine.

Life and career
Pike was born in Hartford Connecticut to John Thomas Pike and Barbara Ann Clapp. He showed interest in the arts at an early age by making his own 8mm films. While attending Granby Memorial High School he served as President of the Drama Club for all four years during which he won Best Actor in 1967 for his role in The Apollo of Bellac. Pike graduated high school in 1969 and later studied Business Management at the University of Hartford.

Pike’s film career began in April 1974, while working as a busboy at the Harborside Restaurant in Martha's Vineyard, after a chance encounter with the first film crew of Jaws (1974) to arrive on the island. Pike was hired onto the film as a local doing set construction, painting of the shark, and ended up working with the Special Effects crew. After Jaws, Pike came out to Hollywood and continued his work in Special Effects with the major studios for film, television, and commercials. His work has served on numerous projects for Steven Spielberg and directors such as Robert Zemeckis, John Schlesinger, Taylor Hackford, David Fincher, Tim Burton, Wes Craven, and George Lucas.

He has also been a Director with the DGA since 1985, after garnering a series of commercials for Mattel and Second Unit directing. He is also a member of SAG/AFTRA and BAFTA. Pike has lectured at USC, UCLA, and Columbia College Hollywood as well as teaching Special Effects classes at the Academy of Art University. Additionally, Pike has served as a Governor for the Academy of Television Arts and Sciences and on the Executive Committee for the Visual Effects Branch for the Academy of Motion Picture Arts and Sciences.

Kevin Pike lives north of Los Angeles, California, where he manages his company,  Filmtrix, Inc.  He is a writer’s consultant and a story developer for studios and production entities, helping writers complete their scripts and advising them on how to pitch their written work to producers and developers. He has three children; Jennifer Pike, Camille Pike, and Jackson Pike.

Awards 
Pike has earned nominations and awards including a Primetime Emmy Award for Outstanding Individual Achievement in Special Visual Effects for the Amblin Television Production Earth 2 in 1995, a Clio Award for Best Special Effects on a Levi’s commercial directed by Michael Bay in 2000. 

He also received a BAFTA nomination, and was considered for Oscar nomination on Back to the Future.

Films 
The following is a list of the most notable films with special effects by Kevin Pike.

1970s
 Jaws (1975)
 Close Encounters of the Third Kind (1977)
 Jaws 2 (1978)
  The Frisco Kid (1979)
 Star Trek: The Motion Picture (1979)
 1941 (1979)
1980s
 Indiana Jones and the Temple of Doom (1984)
 The Last Starfighter (1984)
 Back to the Future (1985)
 Moonwalker (1988)

1990s
 Ed Wood (1994)
 Fight Club (1999)
2000s
 Jurassic Park III (2001)
 44 Minutes (2003)
 Feast (2005)
 Ask the Dust (2006)

References

Sources
 Kevin Pike Biography (1951-)

External links
 

1951 births
Living people
Special effects people
Special effects coordinators
University of Hartford alumni
Artists from Hartford, Connecticut
Emmy Award winners
Academy of Art University faculty